Yuriy Levovych Andruzky (* 7 June 1827 Vechirky, Piryatinsky Uyezd, Poltava Governorate - † after 1864) - Ukrainian political and cultural activist, poet, scientist.

References

External links 
 Andruzky at the NANU Institute of History of Ukraine  (no archive links)
 Andruzky at the Encyclopedia of Ukraine

1827 births
Date of death unknown
Date of death missing
People from Poltava Oblast
People from Piryatinsky Uyezd
Ukrainian people in the Russian Empire
Ukrainian poets
Brotherhood of Saints Cyril and Methodius members
Ukrainian democracy activists
Taras Shevchenko National University of Kyiv alumni